Janice Bryant Howroyd (born September 1, 1952) is an entrepreneur, businesswoman, and author. She is founder and chief executive officer of The ActOne Group, the largest privately held, minority-woman-owned personnel company founded in the U.S. Howroyd is the first African-American woman to build and own a billion dollar company.

Early years
Janice Bryant was born on September 1, 1952 in Tarboro, North Carolina, the fourth of 11 children in her family. As a teen, she was one of the first African American students to participate in desegregation of her town's high school.  Howroyd was educated at North Carolina A&T State University, where she earned a degree in English.

Entrepreneur
In 1976, Howroyd moved to Los Angeles, California, and worked as a temporary secretary for her brother-in-law, Tom Noonan, at Billboard magazine.

While at Billboard, Noonan introduced Howroyd to business executives, celebrities, travel, and workplace diversity.

With an approximate budget of $1,000 Howroyd continued to focus on employment services and launched her own company, The ACT•1 Group, in a small Beverly Hills, California office in 1978, with Tom Noonan as her first client.

Companies 
According to Bloomberg L.P., "ActOne Group, Inc. provides employment, workforce management, and procurement solutions to Fortune 500 organizations, local and mid-market companies, and government agencies." ActOne Group companies include AppleOne, All's Well, AT-Tech, ACT-1 Personnel Services, Agile-1, ACT-1Govt, ACheck GLobal, which provide personnel and recruiting services to different industries, and DSSI, which provides document management services.

Leadership 
Howroyd is an ambassador of the Department of Energy's Minorities in Energy Initiative, a board member to numerous organizations including the United States Department of Labor's Workforce Initiative Board, Women's Business Enterprise National Council, WeConnect, National Utilities Diversity Council, Harvard Women's Leadership Board, California Science Center, Los Angeles Urban League and a member of the Industry Trade Advisory Committee on Services and Finance Industries of the U.S. Trade Representative and the United States Department of Commerce. She also serves on the Board of Trustees for North Carolina Agricultural and Technical State University.

In May 2016 Howroyd received a key presidential appointment by President Barack Obama as a member of the President's Board of Advisors on Historically Black Colleges and Universities. In 2017 she joined the Diversity Committee of the FCC.

Since 2016, Howroyd has served on the Congressional Black Caucus Foundation Board of Directors as an officer as Treasurer.

Philanthropy 
Howroyd, according to the National Association of Women Business Owners, "has had a significant impact on the well-being of her community and ... has had the foresight and generosity to recognize that her success is best savored when she pays it forward." Via scholarship funding and personal service, she supports universities (Harvard University, University of Southern California, California State University, San Bernardino and her own alma mater, North Carolina A&T), women's support organizations (WBENC, WPO, The Trusteeship), Minority serving organizations (NMSDC, Urban League, LAEDC, NUDC and more), and is a mentor to others through personal work and media engagements.

She is a member of the International Trade Advisory Commission Board, Los Angeles Economic Development Corporate Board, and the Women's Leadership Board of the Kennedy School of Government/Harvard University.

Author
Howroyd has been a contributing writer for publications such as Forbes and HuffPost, has recorded several audiobooks, and written two books.

The Art of Work – How to Make Work, Work for You!

Howroyd released her first book The Art of Work in July 2009. The book focused on advice for finding and keeping the right job.

Acting Up – Winning in Business and Life Using Down-Home Wisdom

Howroyd released her second book, Acting Up, in 2019. In Acting Up, Howroyd tells more of her personal life story and shares her advice for entrepreneurs.

Acting Up met positive reaction by critics and press upon its release from publications such as Fast Company and Black Enterprise. Inc. (magazine) included the book as one of their “8 Books For Entrepreneurs Who Insist On Doing Things Differently”.

Awards and honors
2008 The BET Honors Entrepreneur Award - 2008
2011 National Association of Women Business Owners Hall of Fame Honoree - 2011
2015 "National Black College Alumni Hall of Fame" Inductee - 2015
2016 Black Enterprise A.G. Gaston Award - 2016
2022 Women's Entrepreneurship Day Organization Business Pioneer Award - 2022. Howroyd received the Women's Entrepreneurship Day Organization’s Business Pioneer Award at the United Nations in 2022, celebrating her as a trailblazer and innovator in her field. The prestigious award, also recognized by the US Congress, highlights women entrepreneurs and the meaningful impact they are having on the world.

Personal life 
In 1980, she married Bernard Howroyd. They had two children, Katharyn and Brett. The family has residences in England, North Carolina, Las Vegas, Nevada, and Los Angeles, California. Bernard Howroyd died in September 2020, having had suffered from  Alzheimer's disease.

References

External links

 Ask JBH – Personal Website
  ActOne Group official website
  "How I built a billion dollar business" BBC World News

1952 births
Living people
21st-century American businesspeople
African-American business executives
American women business executives
African-American women writers
American business writers
Women business writers
American motivational speakers
Women motivational speakers
People from Tarboro, North Carolina
North Carolina A&T State University alumni
American women non-fiction writers
African-American writers
American women company founders
American company founders
American chief executives
21st-century American businesswomen
21st-century African-American women
21st-century African-American people
20th-century African-American people
20th-century African-American women